DEN Networks Limited is a cable television distribution company in India. It is owned by Sameer Manchanda and was acquired by Reliance Industries in 2018 along with Hathway. In 2003, it stood as one of the three major cable distributors in India alongside Hathway and InCablenet.

The shares would be held through multiple Reliance subsidiaries including Jio Futuristic Digital Holdings Private Limited, Jio Digital Distribution Holdings Private Limited, Jio Television Distribution Holdings Private Limited, Reliance Industries Limited Digital Media Distribution Trust, Reliance Content Distribution Limited and Reliance Industrial Investments and Holdings Limited. At the time of the acquisition, DEN had 106,000 broadband subscribers. The acquisition received approval from the Competition Commission of India in January 2019. Reliance acquired an additional 12.05% stake in DEN in March 2019 taking its total stake in the company to 78.62%.

References

External links
 

Companies based in New Delhi
Internet service providers of India
Cable television companies of India
Reliance Media
Indian companies established in 2007
2007 establishments in Delhi
Companies listed on the National Stock Exchange of India
Companies listed on the Bombay Stock Exchange